Sebastián Alarcón (14 January 1949 – 30 June 2019) was a Chilean film director and screenwriter. His 1977 film Night Over Chile won the Special Prize at the 10th Moscow International Film Festival. In 2008 he was a member of the jury at the 30th Moscow International Film Festival.

Selected filmography
 La primera página (1974, short)
 Night Over Chile (1977)
 Santa Esperanza (1980)
 The Fall of the Condor (1982)
 Jaguar (1986)
  Historia de un Equipo de Billard'. (1988)
 KGB Agents Also Fall in Love (1991)
 The Scar (1999)
 The Photographer'' (2003)

References

External links

1949 births
2019 deaths
Chilean film directors
Chilean screenwriters
Male screenwriters
People from Valparaíso